Kieron Moore (born Ciarán Ó hAnnracháin, anglicised as Kieron O'Hanrahan) (5 October 1924 – 15 July 2007) was an Irish film and television actor whose career was at its peak in the 1950s and 1960s. He may be best remembered for his role as Count Vronsky in the film adaptation of Anna Karenina (1948) with Vivien Leigh.

Early years
Moore was raised in County Cork in an Irish-speaking household. His father, Peadar Ó hAnnracháin (born 1873) (also known as Peter/Peadar Hourihane and Peadar O'Hourihane) was a writer and poet, and a staunch supporter of the Irish language. Peadar, a son of Seaghan Ó hAnnracháin (born 1834) and Máire Ní Dhonabháin (also born 1834) and who was one of the first organisers for Conradh na Gaeilge (Gaelic League), was twice imprisoned by the British during the Irish Civil War. Peadar lived with his parents and his sister, Áine Ní Annracháin (born 1885), and his niece, Máirín Ní Dhiomasaig (born 1903), at 14 Poundlick, Skibbereen, County Cork in 1911. He also wrote for the Southern Star newspaper for many years and had been its editor.

His mother, Máire Ní Dheasmhumhnaigh (born 1888), also known as Mary Desmond, was the daughter of Dónal Ó Deasmhumhnaigh (born 1851) and Nóra Ní Bhriain of Kinsale. Several members of Kieron's family pursued careers in the arts. His sister Neasa Ní Annracháin was a stalwart of the Raidió Éireann Players, while his brother, Fachtna, was director of music at the station, and a second sister, Bláithín Ní Annracháin, played the harp with the National Symphony Orchestra. Following his family's move to Dublin, Moore attended Coláiste Mhuire, an Irish-language school.

Later, his medical studies at University College Dublin were cut short when he was invited to join the players at the Abbey Theatre.

He married Barbara White in 1947; the couple had four children.

Career

Moore began his acting career at the Abbey Theatre in Dublin, and made his British stage debut at the age of 19 as Heathcliff in a production of Wuthering Heights. He featured in the West End in the 1945 war play Desert Rats by Colin Morris.

His first film role was as an IRA man in The Voice Within (1945), where he was billed as "Keiron O'Hanrahan".

He acted on the Liverpool stage in Purple Dust. He gave an acclaimed performance in the West End hit Red Roses for Me (written by Seán O'Casey). This was seen by Alexander Korda, who signed Moore to a long-term contract.

Korda announced he was likely to become a major star:
He has a brilliant acting talent. Then he has six-feet-two of brawn, a mobile photogenic face, rich expressive eyes, and ability to adapt himself to any type of role – ultra romantic or the last word in villainy. Very soon he will be one of the big names on the world's screens."

Adopting the stage name Kieron Moore, he was cast in a leading role in A Man About the House (1947), directed by Leslie Arliss. Arliss said Moore was "terrific. Naturally, since he's had no film experience, his work is still a bit rough, but he does the right thing by instinct. He smashes through at you from the screen."

There followed the psychological thriller Mine Own Executioner (1947), co-starring with Burgess Meredith.

Korda then gave Moore the plum role of the suave Count Vronsky in Julien Duvivier's production of Anna Karenina (1948), which starred Vivien Leigh and Ralph Richardson. The movie was a box-office flop, and Moore received the worst notices of his career. He played Heathcliff in a BBC Television adaptation of Wuthering Heights in 1948.

Korda's fourth film with him was a comedy set in Ireland, Saints and Sinners (1949), directed by Arliss. Moore went to France to co-star with Michèle Morgan in Marc Allégret's Maria Chapdelaine (1950), also known as The Naked Heart.

Hollywood
Moore was invited to Hollywood, where in 1951 he made two films, playing Uriah the Hittite in the biblical epic David and Bathsheba, supporting Gregory Peck and Susan Hayward, and a French Foreign Legion corporal in Ten Tall Men, starring Burt Lancaster. Both were supporting roles.

Moore went to Italy to play the lead in an Italian-English comedy, Honeymoon Deferred (1951). In France, he had a small role in another film for Allegret, La demoiselle et son revenant (1952).

British B films
Moore was in a British B film, Mantrap (1953), for Hammer Films, supporting Paul Henreid.

He had the lead in Recoil (1953, directed by John Gilling), Conflict of Wings (1954) and The Blue Peter (1954).

He supported Michael Redgrave in The Green Scarf (1954). "Thank heavens for this", Moore said. "I've had a rough time of it, especially during the last three years. Now perhaps I can re-establish myself as an actor."

It did not happen. Moore had the lead in the Danzinger Brothers' Satellite in the Sky (1956) and returned to Hammer for The Steel Bayonet (1957).

He directed some episodes of The Vise in 1956-57 and was in Overseas Press Club – Exclusive!, and Three Sundays to Live (1957) for the Danzigers.

Supporting roles and occasional leads
Moore had supporting roles in Carol Reed's The Key (1958) and Robert Aldrich's The Angry Hills (1959) and had a memorable role as town bully Pony Sugrue in Walt Disney's Darby O'Gill and the Little People (1959), where he fought a young Sean Connery. He also guest-starred in Tales of the Vikings (1959).

He gave an impressive performance in the comedy-thriller The League of Gentlemen (1960), playing a homosexual former fascist and army officer recruited to take part in a big robbery. He also played opposite Patrick McGoohan in an episode of Danger Man titled 'The Sanctuary' (1960).

There followed roles in The Day They Robbed the Bank of England (1960), and The Siege of Sidney Street (1960), shot on location in Ireland.

Moore had the lead role in Doctor Blood's Coffin (1961), directed by Sidney J. Furie and supporting roles in I Thank a Fool (1962), The 300 Spartans, The Main Attraction (1962), The Day of the Triffids (1962) (for Philip Yordan), Girl in the Headlines (1963), and Hide and Seek (1964).

Moore did two more for Yordan, The Thin Red Line (1964), and Crack in the World (1965) (the second disaster movie after 'Triffids' where his character's romantically linked to Janette Scott), then Son of a Gunfighter (1965) (all second-billed and all shot in Spain) and Arabesque (1966).  He had lead roles in Bikini Paradise (1967) (filmed in the Canary Islands) and Run Like a Thief (shot in Spain) (1967). In his final film, Custer of the West (1967), he played Chief Dull Knife, for Yordan, again shot in Spain.

He also made television appearances in such shows as Three Live Wires, Sir Francis Drake, Zero One. Boy Meets Girl, Department S, Vendetta, Jason King, The Adventurer, The Protectors and Randall and Hopkirk (Deceased)—the last of these was in the episode "When the Spirit Moves You", as the villain Miklos Corri.

Moore created a TV series, Ryan International (1970), which he also starred in and wrote some episodes. It ran for ten episodes.

His last acting appearance was in an episode of The Zoo Gang (1974).

Post-acting career
Moore quit acting in 1974, becoming a social activist on behalf of the Third World. He joined CAFOD (Catholic Agency for Overseas Development), with which he worked for nine years.

During that time he made two film documentaries, Progress of Peoples (Peru) and The Parched Earth (Senegal). Later, as projects manager, he travelled to the Middle East and India. He next became associate editor of The Universe, editing its supplement New Creation, which he transformed into the magazine New Day.

He last worked for television, providing voice-overs for Muiris Mac Conghail's RTÉ documentaries about the Aran Islands and the Blaskets.

Moore retired in 1994 to the Charente-Maritime in France, where he joined the church choir, became a hospital visitor, and enjoyed reading French, Spanish, English and Irish literature.

He was survived by his wife, the former actress Barbara White, who played opposite him in The Voice Within and Mine Own Executioner, their daughter Theresa (Soeur Miriame-Therese) and sons Casey, Colm and Seán.

Selected filmography

 A Man About the House (1947) – Salvatore
 Mine Own Executioner (1947) – Adam Lucian
 Anna Karenina (1948) – Count Vronsky
 Saints and Sinners (1949) – Michael Kissane
 The Naked Heart (1950) – Lorenzo Suprenant
 Honeymoon Deferred (1951) – Rocco
 David and Bathsheba (1951) – Uriah
 Ten Tall Men (1951) – Corporal Pierre Molier
 Mantrap (1953) – Speight
 Recoil (1953) – Nicholas Conway
 Conflict of Wings (1954) – Squadron Leader Parsons
 The Green Scarf (1954) – Jacques
 The Blue Peter (1955) – Mike Merriworth
 Satellite in the Sky (1956) – Michael
 The Steel Bayonet (1957) – Capt. R. A. Mead
 Three Sundays to Live (1957) – Frank Martin
 The Key (1958) – Kane
 The Angry Hills (1959) – Andreas
 Darby O'Gill and the Little People (1959) – Pony Sugrue
 The League of Gentlemen (1960) – Stevens
 The Day They Robbed the Bank of England (1960) – Walsh
 The Siege of Sidney Street (1960) – Toska
 Doctor Blood's Coffin (1961) – Dr. Peter Blood
 The Day of the Triffids (1962) – Tom Goodwin
 I Thank a Fool (1962) – Roscoe
 The 300 Spartans (1962) – Ephialtes
 Marauders of the Sea (1962)
 The Main Attraction (1962) – Ricco Moreno
 Girl in the Headlines (1963) – Herter
 Hide and Seek (1964) – Paul
 The Thin Red Line (1964) – Lt. Band
 Crack in the World (1965) – Dr. Ted Rampion
 Son of a Gunfighter (1965) – Deputy Mace Fenton
 Arabesque (1966) – Yussef Kasim
 Run Like a Thief (1967) – Johnny Dent
 Bikini Paradise  (1967) – Lt. Allison Fraser
 Custer of the West (1967) – Chief Dull Knife

References

External links

Obituary, London Daily Telegraph
Obituary, The Irish Times

1924 births
2007 deaths
Irish male film actors
Irish male television actors
People from Skibbereen
People from County Cork
Irish male stage actors
20th-century Irish male actors
People educated at Coláiste Mhuire, Dublin